Baalu Belagithu is a 1970 Indian Kannada language drama film written and directed by Siddalingaiah. It stars Rajkumar in dual roles with Jayanthi and Bharathi. The film was released under Chitrashree International banner and produced by K S Prasad, B V Srinivas and A S Bhakthavathsalam. It was remade in Telugu as Manchivadu ,  in Hindi as Humshakal and in Tamil as Oorukku Uzhaippavan.

Cast 
 Rajkumar as Shankar / Papanna (dual roles)
 Jayanthi as Lalitha
 Bharathi as Lakshmi
 T. B. Nagappa
 Dwarakish 
 Prabhakar
 Rama
 Shanthamma
 Jyothi Lakshmi in an item song

Soundtrack 
The music of the film was composed by Vijaya Bhaskar and lyrics for the soundtrack written by Chi. Udaya Shankar and Vijaya Narasimha.

Track list

See also
 Kannada films of 1970

References

External links 
 

1970 films
1970s Kannada-language films
Indian black-and-white films
Indian drama films
Twins in Indian films
Films scored by Vijaya Bhaskar
Films directed by Siddalingaiah
Kannada films remade in other languages
1970 drama films